Nemaschema is a genus of longhorn beetles of the subfamily Lamiinae, containing the following species:

 Nemaschema baladicum (Montrouzier, 1861)
 Nemaschema chlorizans Fauvel, 1906
 Nemaschema collarti Breuning, 1958
 Nemaschema flavovittatum Breuning, 1976
 Nemaschema griseum Fauvel, 1906
 Nemaschema lamberti (Montrouzier, 1861)
 Nemaschema limbicolle (Fauvel, 1906)
 Nemaschema lineatum Fauvel, 1906
 Nemaschema macilentum Fauvel, 1906
 Nemaschema mulsanti Perroud, 1864
 Nemaschema nitidulum Fauvel, 1906
 Nemaschema ochreovittatum Breuning, 1978
 Nemaschema olivaceum Breuning, 1950
 Nemaschema parteflavoantennatum Breuning, 1969
 Nemaschema puberulum (Montrouzier, 1861)
 Nemaschema quadrisulcatum Breuning, 1940
 Nemaschema sanguinicolle (Chevrolat, 1858)
 Nemaschema viridipes (Fauvel, 1906)

References

Enicodini